Sportsnet is a Canadian English-language discretionary sports specialty channel owned by Rogers Sports & Media. It was established in 1998 as CTV Sportsnet, a joint venture between CTV, Liberty Media, and Rogers Media. CTV parent Bell Globemedia then was required to divest its stake in the network following its 2001 acquisition of competing network TSN. Rogers then became the sole owner of Sportsnet in 2004 after it bought the remaining minority stake that was held by Fox.

The Sportsnet license comprises four 24-hour programming services; Sportsnet was originally licensed by the Canadian Radio-television and Telecommunications Commission (CRTC) as a category A service, operating as a group of regional sports networks offering programming tailored to each feed's region (in contrast to TSN, which was licensed at the time to operate as a national sports service, and could only offer limited regional opt-outs). Since 2011, the service has operated under deregulated category C licensing, which allows Sportsnet to operate multiple feeds with no restrictions on alternate programming. In each region, only the local Sportsnet channel is available on analogue cable, but all four channels are available nationally via digital cable (subject to blackouts for some out-of-market teams).

The four Sportsnet feeds air some common programming and simulcast major, national events, but are capable of airing programming autonomously—most prominently regional programming. Sportsnet is the national cable rightsholder of the National Hockey League, and also holds regional rights to five of the league's Canadian franchises. It is also the national rightsholder of Major League Baseball in Canada (although most of ESPN's MLB broadcasts are sub-licensed to rival network TSN), and the exclusive broadcaster of the co-owned Toronto Blue Jays. It also splits regional coverage of the NHL's Toronto Maple Leafs and national coverage of the NBA's Toronto Raptors with TSN; Rogers Communications and TSN's parent company Bell Canada own a joint majority stake in the teams' parent company.

The Sportsnet brand has since been extended beyond the original regional channels, now encompassing the national channels Sportsnet 360, Sportsnet One (and its regional part-time companion channels), and Sportsnet World; Sportsnet Radio stations in Toronto, Vancouver and Calgary; and Sportsnet Magazine. With these brand extensions, Rogers now generally uses "Sportsnet" (by itself) to denote its sports media properties as a whole, and on-air promotions for programs being carried nationally by these four regional feeds often list all four channels separately, or refer to the Sportsnet "regional" (or "main") channels, to avoid any ambiguity. However, standalone mentions of "Sportsnet" in reference to a specific channel can still generally be assumed to be referring to the four regional channels (or the specific regional channel available locally on analogue cable).

History
Sportsnet was approved by the CRTC in September 1996 under the tentative name S3, with Baton Broadcasting Inc. (later renamed to CTV Inc.) holding a 40% controlling interest in the network, and 20% minority stakes held by Rogers Media and Liberty Media (in turn a spin-off of TCI, an American cable-television group). The network proposed a structure with an emphasis on regional programming, operating four feeds to serve different areas of the country.

The network launched on October 9, 1998, as CTV Sportsnet, under the ownership of CTV, Rogers, and Liberty; the latter which owned some of the Fox Sports Net operations that Fox ran in the United States after which the channel was named.

The new network gained credibility before it went on the air, having acquired national cable rights to the National Hockey League from long-time holder TSN. From 1998–99 until 2001–02, Sportsnet aired NHL games to a national audience throughout the regular season, and covered first-round playoff series not involving Canadian teams. Its first live sports event was an NHL opening night telecast between the Philadelphia Flyers and New York Rangers. The national cable rights to the NHL returned to TSN in 2002, though Sportsnet retained regional broadcast rights for most Canadian NHL teams.

Acquisition by Rogers
When CTV purchased NetStar, the former parent company of TSN, in 2000, the CRTC ordered CTV to sell either TSN or its stake in Sportsnet. CTV ultimately chose to retain TSN, and sell its stake in Sportsnet. The other shareholders had first right of refusal; as Rogers was the only interested party, it acquired CTV's stake in the summer of 2001, and soon after renamed it Rogers Sportsnet. During part of the transition period, during which time the channel was known as "Sportsnet", CTV was allowed to control programming on both networks, and some cross-affiliation and programs that were going to be tape-delayed on TSN, most notably figure skating, were given to Sportsnet.  In 2004, Rogers then bought the remaining 20 percent stake from Fox.

While Sportsnet had been based there from the beginning, TSN's operations would move to CTV's suburban Toronto complex, 9 Channel Nine Court, following the acquisition. This led to some peculiarities related to the fact that the two rival sports channels were only separated by a "parking lot", leading to jokes and references from both networks. On April 30, 2008, Rogers Sportsnet moved its broadcast operations from 9 Channel Nine Court to the Rogers Building, a cluster of buildings in the Mount Pleasant-Jarvis Street area of Downtown Toronto.

Expansion 
In 2010, Rogers began to extend the Sportsnet brand beyond the original regional networks with the August 14 launch of Rogers Sportsnet One – a national companion channel promising 800 hours of live events per year. The channel was also accompanied by additional part-time feeds to serve as overflow channels for its regional NHL coverage.

In January 2011, Rogers' sports radio stations, CJCL Toronto ("The Fan 590") and CFAC Calgary ("The Fan 960"), were rebranded as "Sportsnet Radio Fan 590" and "Sportsnet Radio Fan 960" respectively. Critics speculated that the Sportsnet Radio branding was intended to increase synergy with its television counterparts, upon rumors that TSN would be launching a sports radio network of its own.

In July 2011, Rogers announced that it would be rebranding its premium international sports channel Setanta Sports Canada as "Sportsnet World" on October 3, 2011 – a move that would allow the channel better opportunities for cross-promotion with other Sportsnet services. As part of the transition, Setanta Sports sold its minority ownership interest in the channel to MLM Management.

On September 29, 2011, Rogers published the first issue of Sportsnet Magazine, a bi-weekly sports magazine positioned "for Canadian sports fans", covering professional sports from a Canadian perspective. Sports writer Stephen Brunt left his position at The Globe and Mail newspaper to become the magazine's back page columnist.

"Fuelled By Fans" re-launch
On October 3, 2011, Rogers Sportsnet underwent a major rebranding, introducing a revamped logo and visual appearance designed in conjunction with Troika Design Group, and a new image campaign ("Fuelled By Fans"). Additionally, the network's official name was shortened to just Sportsnet. The new logo does not incorporate the previous "player" emblem that had been used in the network's branding since its original launch, as research performed by Rogers indicated that its association with Sportsnet did not resonate well with viewers. The redesign of Sportsnet was overseen by Dean Bender, who served as the network's creative director upon its original launch as CTV Sportsnet.

2013–2018
On August 25, 2012, Rogers announced that it would acquire the television assets of Score Media, owners of The Score Television Network (a competing sports network which primarily airs sports news and highlights, alongside event coverage), in a transaction valued at $167 million. The acquisition itself closed on October 19, 2012, at which point Score Media's digital assets (including its website and mobile apps) were spun off into another company, theScore Inc., in which Rogers Media would retain a 10% interest. Score Media's TV properties were immediately placed into a blind trust, under trustee Peter Viner, pending final CRTC approval. Rogers plans to continue running the network as a sports news service.

The acquisition and Rogers' proposed amendments (which included a reduction in the frequency of sports updates during live events) were approved by the CRTC on April 30, 2013; the same day, The Score also began to air more Sportsnet-produced programming, including a simulcast of CJCL's afternoon show Tim & Sid and Hockey Central Playoff Extra. However, the CRTC rejected the use of a proposed winter sports competition, the Sportsnet Winter Games, for its tangible benefits requirements.

On June 4, 2013, Rogers announced that The Score would be rebranded as a Sportsnet channel; the channel changed its name to Sportsnet 360 on July 1, 2013. As of 2014, Sportsnet is available in 8.2 million Canadian homes.

On October 2, 2018, Scott Moore, Rogers' head of Sportsnet and NHL properties, stepped down.

Regional feeds
Similarly to regional sports networks in the United States, Sportsnet is operated in four regional feeds. While the feeds carry national programming as well, they primarily broadcast sporting events tailored to the region they serve. The four regional feeds are listed in the table below.

All four feeds are available in both standard and high-definition formats. Although cable providers in Canada are permitted to carry only the local Sportsnet feed on analogue cable packages, all four feeds can be carried on digital television services. However, in some instances, programming on the out-of-market Sportsnet feeds, particularly regional NHL games, are blacked out due to league restrictions on teams' regional broadcast rights. Since the revival of the Winnipeg Jets in 2011, regional Flames and Oilers games on Sportsnet West have also been blacked out in Manitoba, despite it being the "local" Sportsnet feed for that province.

Programming

Sportsnet is the main television outlet for Major League Baseball in Canada: it is the exclusive television outlet for the Toronto Blue Jays (which are also owned by Rogers), airing all of its games and other Blue Jays-related programming throughout the season. It also holds Canadian rights to Fox Saturday Baseball, the All-Star Game and the postseason (through Fox, TBS and MLB International). Sportsnet also carries other MLB games simulcast from U.S. regional sports networks.

Sportsnet began airing National Football League games Starting with the 2005 season, splitting late games across the Pacific and West feeds, and the East and Ontario feeds. The games not shown in the opposite regions were carried regionally by City. It also had rights to Thursday Night Football and the American Thanksgiving games. Sportsnet lost all NFL broadcasting rights for the 2017 season.

Sportsnet carried a large amount of soccer programming; it has been the Canadian broadcaster of the Premier League since 1998 until 2018/19 season (from 2013/14 to 2018/19 season, Sportsnet jointly held Canadian rights to the Premier League with TSN), and also held rights to the FA Cup, UEFA Champions League and Europa League. Sportsnet lost UEFA coverage to TSN for 2015, but gained rights to Bundesliga matches beginning in the 2015–16 season. Sportsnet aired the Amway Canadian Championship, an annual competition featuring Canada's five professional soccer teams – Toronto FC, CF Montréal, Vancouver Whitecaps FC, FC Edmonton, and Ottawa Fury FC, until TSN acquired full rights in 2017.

In 2006, Sportsnet aired coverage of the FIFA World Cup as part of a consortium with TSN and CTV. From 2011 through 2014, beginning with the 2011 FIFA Women's World Cup, CBC sub-licensed cable rights to FIFA tournaments to Sportsnet, including the 2014 FIFA World Cup.

On February 8, 2011, Sportsnet announced that it had signed a multi-year deal with Tennis Canada to acquire early round rights to the Rogers Cup. Sportsnet also acquired rights to the ATP World Tour Masters 1000 and ATP World Tour 500 series events. As per an extension of Rogers' sponsorship rights to the tournament, Sportsnet holds sole rights to the Rogers Cup beginning in 2016. In 2016, Sportsnet lost the ATP tours to TSN, but it still maintains exclusive rights to the Rogers Cup, as well as the Davis Cup and Fed Cup.

In February 2013, Sportsnet announced that it would become the official Canadian broadcaster of the IndyCar Series beginning in the 2013 season in a five-year deal with the series. The new contract includes broadcasts on Sportsnet's networks and City, and French rights sub-licensed to TVA Sports. That season, Sportsnet also originated coverage from the Honda Grand Prix of St. Petersburg, Indianapolis 500 and Honda Indy Toronto, with Bill Adam, Todd Lewis and Rob Faulds. Canadian driver Paul Tracy joined Sportsnet as an analyst. As of the 2019 season, all but the Honda Indy Toronto and Indianapolis 500 moved exclusively to Sportsnet World and Sportsnet Now+.

In May 2013, Sportsnet reached a six-year deal for rights to the national championships of U Sports (then known as Canadian Interuniversity Sport), including coverage of the Vanier Cup.

Hockey coverage
Sportsnet is a major broadcaster of National Hockey League games; the network is the current national cable rightsholder to the league, and regularly airs nationally televised games on Wednesday, Saturday nights as part of Hockey Night in Canada, and Monday nights as part of Rogers Hometown Hockey. Sportsnet is also a major regional broadcaster of the NHL; its four regional feeds carry regional telecasts of five of the seven Canadian franchises, including the Toronto Maple Leafs on Sportsnet Ontario (split with TSN4 beginning in 2014–15; Rogers and Bell Canada own a joint, majority stake in the team's parent company Maple Leaf Sports & Entertainment), the Calgary Flames and Edmonton Oilers on Sportsnet West, and the Vancouver Canucks on Sportsnet Pacific.

In January 2014, Sportsnet lost the Ottawa Senators to TSN, who acquired regional rights to the team in English and French under a 12-year deal, beginning in the 2014–15 season. In September 2014, Sportsnet announced its acquisition of regional English-language television rights to the Montreal Canadiens under a 3-year deal, replacing the Senators on Sportsnet East and succeeding TSN as regional rightsholder, until 2016–17.

Sportsnet held the rights to the Canadian Hockey League under a 12-year deal renewed in the 2014–15 season. Its coverage included a package of national broadcasts from the CHL's member leagues, coverage of the CHL Canada/Russia Series and the CHL/NHL Top Prospects Game, along with coverage of the season-ending Memorial Cup tournament. In the 2021–22 season, Sportsnet lost the rights to CBC Sports and TSN, with the latter covering the Memorial Cup.

National NHL contracts

From its launch through 2002, Sportsnet was the national cable broadcaster of the NHL in Canada, displacing the rival TSN; it aired a package of Tuesday night games, along with coverage of non-Canadian matchups from the first round of the Stanley Cup Playoffs.

On November 26, 2013, Rogers Communications announced that it had reached a 12-year deal to become the exclusive national rightsholder for the National Hockey League, again displacing TSN, along with CBC, a deal which began in the 2014–15 season. Valued at $5.2 billion and covering both television and digital media rights to the league, the value of the contract surpassed the league's most recent U.S. rights deal with NBC. Alongside its existing regional rights, Sportsnet now airs Scotiabank Wednesday Night Hockey, along with games during Hockey Night in Canada.

Olympics coverage
In early 2005, Rogers Media and CTVglobemedia jointly acquired broadcast rights to the Vancouver 2010 Winter Olympics, as well as the London 2012 Summer Olympics. This was considered a serious coup, as the Canadian Broadcasting Corporation (CBC) had consistently won Olympic broadcast rights from the 1996 Summer Olympics through to the 2008 Summer Olympics. CTV and V were the primary broadcasters; Sportsnet, TSN and RDS provided supplementary coverage. Rogers announced in 2011 that it would not bid with CTVglobemedia's predecessor Bell Media for the rights to the 2014 and 2016 games, citing scheduling and financial issues.

While Bell Media did attempt to partner with the CBC in 2011 to bid for coverage, CBC reached a deal of its own in August 2012, winning the rights to the 2014 and 2016 Games. On February 7, 2013, CBC announced that it had reached deals with Sportsnet and TSN for both networks to become their official cable partners, beginning at the 2014 Winter Olympics. CBC will continue this sub-licensing agreement through the 2020 Summer Olympics.

Sportsnet televised coverage of the 2015 Pan-American Games, also as part of a sub-license with CBC; it aired coverage of the soccer tournaments, as well as a Men's basketball semi-final game involving Canada.

Summary of sports rights

Baseball 

 Major League Baseball: All Toronto Blue Jays games, All-Star Game (through MLB International), post-seasons (through Fox, TBS), World Series (through MLB International), other MLB games simulcast from U.S. broadcasters

Hockey 

 National Hockey League: 
National rights through 2026, including weekly national games, all playoff games, and other NHL games simulcast from U.S. broadcasters.
Holds regional rights to the Calgary Flames, Edmonton Oilers, Toronto Maple Leafs (split with TSN), and Vancouver Canucks

Basketball 

 National Basketball Association: splits regional coverage of Toronto Raptors and NBA playoffs with TSN; selected NBA games
FIBA (through 2025)

Football 

 England: FA Cup, FA Community Shield (until 2024), FA WSL, Women's FA Cup (from 2020-21 season)
 Germany: Bundesliga, DFB-Pokal, DFL-Supercup (2015–present)
International: 2022 FIFA World Cup qualification – CONCACAF Third Round (Canada games only, minus USA home games, sublicensed from OneSoccer)

Tennis 

 Canadian Open
 Davis Cup 
 Billie Jean King Cup

Curling 

 Grand Slam of Curling (2012–present) (selected events sub-licensed to CBC Sports)

Olympics 

 Summer and Winter Olympics, sublicensed from CBC

Original programs 
Sportsnet Central – The daily sports news/highlights program of Sportsnet. Hosted by various personalities. Formerly known as Sportscentral, Sportsnetnews, and Sportsnet Connected.
Hockey Central – News and reports from the NHL. Hosted by Caroline Cameron, and features hockey analysts Nick Kypreos, Bill Watters and Gord Stellick.
Hockey Central at Noon – Simulcast from CJCL; News and reports from the NHL. Hosted by Marek and features either Nick Kypreos or Bill Berg as co-host.
Premier League Matchday – News and reports from the Canadian and world soccer scene and highlights from matches from all the major leagues in Europe and around the world with Gerry Dobson and Craig Forrest.
Tim & Friends - sports talk program hosted by Tim Micallef.

Notable on-air staff

David Amber (also with CBC Sports)
Colby Armstrong
Caroline Cameron
Jamie Campbell
Anthony Carelli
Sam Cosentino
Chris Cuthbert
Steve Dangle
Louie DeBrusk
Rob Faulds
Brad Fay
Elliotte Friedman (also with CBC Sports)
Martine Gaillard
Garry Galley
John Garrett
Kelly Hrudey
Ron MacLean (also with CBC Sports)
Hazel Mae
Jeff Marek
Buck Martinez
Jack Michaels
Greg Millen
Dan Murphy
Scott Oake (also with CBC Sports)
Evanka Osmak
Darren Pang
Gene Principe
Cabbie Richards
John Shannon
John Shorthouse
Dan Shulman (also with ESPN)
Christine Simpson
Craig Simpson
Gord Stellick
Jason York

Notable alumni
This list includes the all time Sportsnet 360 staff dated to its days as The Score.

R.J. Broadhead 
Dean Brown (at TSN Radio 1200)
Hugh Burrill
Don Cherry
Bob Cole
Damien Cox
James Cybulski
Gerry Dee
Chantal Desjardins
Gerry Dobson
Brendan Dunlop
Darren Dreger (at TSN)
Craig Forrest (at CBC Television and OneSoccer)
Erin Hawksworth (at WJLA-TV)
Glenn Healy
Jim Hughson
Mike Johnson (at TSN)
Chris Johnston (at TSN)
Nick Kypreos
Steve Kouleas (at TSN)
Doug MacLean
Bob McCown
Daren Millard
Deb Matejicka
Roger Millions
Gabriel Morency (at The Fight Network)
Arda Ocal 
Sara Orlesky (at TSN)
Renee Paquette (at WWE as Renee Young)
Kevin Quinn
Rick Ralph
Jackie Redmond (at NHL Network (U.S. TV Network), MLB Network)
Dave Randorf
Drew Remenda
Paul Romanuk
Greg Sansone
P.J. Stock (at RDS)
George Stroumboulopoulos
Pat Tabler
Don Taylor (at TSN Radio 1040)
Adnan Virk (at ESPN)
Gregg Zaun

Other services

Sportsnet Now 

In 2014, Sportsnet announced the launch of a new TV Everywhere service known as Sportsnet Now, allowing online streaming of the Sportsnet regional channels, Sportsnet One, and Sportsnet 360 for cable subscribers. On March 31, 2016, Rogers announced that Sportsnet Now would be made available as an over-the-top streaming service for cord cutters, initially priced at $24.99 per-month, in addition to remaining available at no additional charge to cable subscribers. 

In October 2018, the price was dropped to $19.99, annual subscription options were added, and an additional tier known as Sportsnet Now+ was introduced, adding additional international soccer and rugby events, and out-of-market streaming of regional NHL games for Canadian teams whose rights are owned by Sportsnet. NHL Live, the NHL's digital out-of-market sports package, was later added to Sportsnet Now+ in January 2021. 

In April 2022, the plan structures were changed; a $24.99 tier was reintroduced which adds WWE Network, while Now+ was replaced with Sportsnet Now Premium, which is priced at $34.99 per-month and includes WWE Network and out-of-market NHL games beginning the 2022–23 season (replacing NHL Live).

High-definition television
Sportsnet operates four high-definition feeds, one for each regional channel. Originally, Sportsnet operated one national feed that consisted primarily of a simulcast of Sportsnet Ontario, carrying nationally televised events, or separate content from other regional feeds. That feed was launched on September 1, 2003.

In 2007, Sportsnet began using a second high-definition feed in order to broadcast selected regional NHL games in HD, beginning in the 2007–08 NHL season, activated only in the regions where a game is set to be televised. On January 26, 2009, the national HD feed was replaced by individual HD feeds for each region.

4K 
On October 5, 2015, Rogers announced that it planned to produce 101 sports telecasts in 4K ultra-high-definition format in 2016, including all Toronto Blue Jays home games, and "marquee" NHL games beginning in January 2016. These broadcasts are offered via a part-time Sportsnet 4K channel on participating television providers.

On January 14, 2016, in cooperation with BT Sport, Sportsnet broadcast the first ever NBA game produced in 4K, and the first live sporting event in 4K in Canadian history—a Toronto Raptors/Orlando Magic game at O2 Arena in London. Sportsnet's first domestic 4K telecast, a Toronto Maple Leafs/Montreal Canadiens game, aired January 23, 2016.

References

Sources

External links
 

 
Rogers Communications
Sports television networks in Canada
Television channels and stations established in 1998
English-language television stations in Canada
Analog cable television networks in Canada
Franchised radio formats
Former News Corporation subsidiaries
Category C services
1998 establishments in Canada